Frederick Epps Brown (August 27, 1858 – July 3, 1928) was an American politician. He was a member of the Arkansas House of Representatives, serving from 1893 to 1898 and from 1909 to 1911. He was a member of the Democratic party.

References

1928 deaths
1858 births
People from Choctaw County, Mississippi
Speakers of the Arkansas House of Representatives
Democratic Party members of the Arkansas House of Representatives